Moraine Lake is a glacially fed lake in Banff National Park,  outside the hamlet of Lake Louise, Alberta, Canada.

The lake, being glacially fed, does not reach its crest until middle to late June. When it is full, it reflects a distinctive shade of azure blue. The unique colour is due to the refraction of light off the rock flour deposited in the lake on a continual basis by surrounding glaciers.

The road to Moraine Lake is only open during the summer months (June-Sep). Since 2023, Parks Canada has closed it for personal vehicles year-round with only its shuttles, public transit and commercial operators allowed to access the road. Visitors can also bike the road.

Tourism

Hiking trails
The area around the lake has several walking/hiking trails that are, from time to time, restricted. The trail most commonly taken by tourists is The Rockpile Trail, which is along the actual moraine. The view of the lake from the top of the rockpile is one of the most photographed locations in all of Canada. That view of the mountains behind the lake in Valley of the Ten Peaks is known as the "Twenty Dollar View", as Moraine Lake was featured on the reverse side of the 1969 and 1979 issues of the Canadian twenty dollar bill; see . The area often experiences congestion due to the high level of tourism.

Upon reaching Consolation Lakes hikers may continue along to the upper lake, which is not visible from the end of the lower lake. There is, however, no clearly marked trail, and can often be a scramble over large rocky areas.

Near the canoe docks of Moraine Lake Lodge there is another trail-head.  This trail-head is the start of two trails, one of which branches out into four different trails - so there are in total, five trails starting at that trail-head (Moraine Lake Lake shore Trail, Eiffel Lake, Wenkchemna Pass, Larch Valley, and Sentinel Pass). The Lake Louise & Yoho Map provides information on these trails.

Mountaineering routes
The Neil Colgan Hut can be reached in 8 to 12 hours climbing the Perren Route from Moraine Lake.

Road access 
In 2023, Parks Canada announced that personal vehicles would no longer be allowed on the road year-round. Visitors would need to use the park's shuttles, public transportation, or registered commercial operators to access the lake. People with disabilities are exempt if they have a permit, and the road is also still accessible by bike and foot. The agency said that the move was necessary because parking could not accommodate the surging traffic, with only a "very small percentage" of cars being allowed on the road in 2022 and the rest having to be turned away. It also noted how having to turn away so many vehicles was creating a safety hazard, with staff being confronted and harassed by disgruntled visitors.

Appearances

The image of Moraine Lake is world-famous and appears in many places, including:
On the reverse side of the 1969 and 1979 issues of the Canadian twenty dollar bill.
In one of the main preview pictures for Google's operating system Android, Moraine lake was used as a background picture.

In one of the backgrounds available on the Blackberry Pearl.
In one of the backgrounds available on the Palm Pre.
In one of Windows Vista Starter wallpapers.

In one of Windows 7's backgrounds in the "Canada" series.
As the Bing homepage on October 13, 2009, on October 2, 2013, and again on September 10, 2014.

As the National Geographic Travel 365: Photo of the Day for October 8, 2013.
As a photo in Joel's Texas home in the video game The Last of Us.
On a postcard in the video game Until Dawn (the card however says Calgary).
In the login screen of Windows 10.
As a colour image, which was reproduced from photo taken by photographer Peter McKinnon, on one of Royal Canadian Mint 2 oz. silver coins.
As a trout and perch fishery in the 2018 video game Ultimate Fishing Simulator.
Road access

Image gallery

See also

List of lakes
Natural environment
Nature

References

External links

Parks Canada - Banff National Park Visitor Information Centres, including hours of operation and contact information.
Moraine Lake, Banff National Park
Moraine Lake Video - Video and Geographic Position of Moraine Lake.
Interactive Panorama: Moraine Lake

Banff National Park
Lakes of Alberta
Mountain lakes